Varli may refer to:

 Varli people, an ethnic community of Maharashtra and Gujarat, India
 Varli language, the Indo-Aryan language spoken by the Warli people
 Varlı, a village in Azerbaijan
 Worli, a locality in Mumbai, India
 Muharrem Varlı (born 1969), Turkish politician

See also 
 Warli painting